The Douglas AIR-2 Genie (previous designation MB-1) was an unguided air-to-air rocket with a 1.5 kt W25 nuclear warhead. It was deployed by the United States Air Force (USAF 1957–1985) and Canada (Royal Canadian Air Force 1965–68, Air Command 1968–84) during the Cold War. Production ended in 1962 after over 3,000 were made, with some related training and test derivatives being produced later.

Development

The interception of Soviet strategic bombers was a major military preoccupation of the late 1940s and 1950s.  The revelation in 1947 that the Soviet Union had produced a reverse-engineered copy of the Boeing B-29 Superfortress, the Tupolev Tu-4 (NATO reporting name "Bull"), which could reach the continental United States in a one-way attack, followed by the Soviets developing their own atomic bomb in 1949, produced considerable anxiety.

The World War II-age fighter armament of machine guns and cannon were inadequate to stop attacks by massed formations of high-speed bombers. Firing large volleys of unguided rockets into bomber formations was not much better, and true air-to-air missiles were in their infancy. In 1954 Douglas Aircraft began a program to investigate the possibility of a nuclear-armed air-to-air weapon. To ensure simplicity and reliability, the weapon would be unguided, since the large blast radius made precise accuracy unnecessary.

The then top-secret project had various code names, such as Bird Dog, Ding Dong, and High Card. Full-scale development began in 1955, with test firing of inert warhead rockets commencing in early 1956. The final design carried a 1.5-kiloton W25 nuclear warhead and was powered by a Thiokol SR49-TC-1 solid-fuel rocket engine of  thrust, sufficient to accelerate the rocket to Mach 3.3 during its two-second burn. Total flight time was about 12 seconds, during which time the rocket covered . Targeting, arming, and firing of the weapon were coordinated by the launch aircraft's fire-control system. Detonation was by time-delay fuze, although the fuzing mechanism would not arm the warhead until engine burn-out, to give the launch aircraft sufficient time to turn and escape. However, there was no mechanism for disarming the warhead after launch. Once fired, the Genie's short flight-time and large blast radius made it virtually impossible for a bomber to avoid destruction.

The new rocket entered service with the designation MB-1 Genie in 1957. The first interceptor squadrons to carry the MB-1 declared initial operational capability on Jan. 1, 1957, when a handful of rockets and 15 F-89 interceptors capable of carrying them were deployed at Wurtsmith Air Force Base in northern Michigan and Hamilton Air Force Base outside of San Francisco.  By the next year, 268 F-89s had received the necessary wing pylon and fire-control system modifications to carry the weapon. While officially known as the MB-1 Genie, the rocket was often nicknamed "Ding-Dong" by crews and pilots. About 3,150 Genie rockets were produced before production ended in 1963. In 1962 the weapon was redesignated AIR-2A Genie. Many rounds were upgraded with improved, longer-duration rocket motors; the upgraded weapons sometimes known (apparently only semi-officially) as AIR-2B. An inert training round, originally MB-1-T and later ATR-2A, was also produced in small numbers - the training version was known to Canadian crews as the "dum-dum".

A live Genie was detonated only once, in Operation Plumbbob on 19 July 1957. It was fired by USAF Captain Eric William Hutchison (pilot) and USAF Captain Alfred C. Barbee (radar operator) flying an F-89J over Yucca Flats. A group of five USAF officers volunteered to stand uncovered in their light summer uniforms underneath the blast to prove that the weapon was safe for use over populated areas. They were photographed by Department of Defense photographer George Yoshitake who stood there with them. Gamma and neutron doses received by observers on the ground were negligible. Doses received by aircrew were highest for the fliers assigned to penetrate the airburst cloud ten minutes after explosion. 

While in service with the U.S. Air Force, the Genie was carried operationally on the F-89 Scorpion, F-101B Voodoo, and the F-106 Delta Dart.  While the Genie was originally intended to be carried by the F-104 Starfighter using a unique 'trapeze' launching rail, the project never proceeded beyond the testing phase. Convair offered an upgrade of the F-102 Delta Dagger that would have been Genie-capable, but it too was not adopted. Operational use of the Genie was discontinued in 1988 with the retirement of the F-106 interceptor.

The only other Genie user was Canada, whose CF-101 Voodoos carried Genies until 1984 via a dual-key arrangement where the missiles were kept under United States custody, and released to Canada under circumstances requiring their use. The RAF briefly considered the missile for use on the English Electric Lightning.

Safety features included final arming by detecting the acceleration and deceleration of a fast aircraft at high altitude. The weapon was built too early to use a permissive action link security device.

The F-89J that was used to launch the only live test is on static display at the Montana Air National Guard in Great Falls, Montana.

Operators

Royal Canadian Air Force/Canadian Forces Air Command

United States Air Force

Survivors
Below is a list of museums which have a Genie rocket in their collection:
Air Force Armament Museum, Eglin Air Force Base, Florida
Atlantic Canada Aviation Museum, Halifax, Nova Scotia
Hill Aerospace Museum, Ogden, Utah
MAPS Air Museum, Akron-Canton Regional Airport, Ohio ATR-2 with MF-9 trailer
Museum of Aviation at Robins Air Force Base, Georgia ATR-2N with MF-9 trailer 
National Museum of the United States Air Force, Wright-Patterson Air Force Base, Ohio
Oregon Military Museum at Camp Withycombe, Clackamas, Oregon
Pima Air & Space Museum, Tucson, Arizona Inert round with trailer
Selfridge Air National Guard Base Museum, Harrison Township, Michigan
Western Canada Aviation Museum, Winnipeg, Manitoba, Canada
Ellsworth Air and Space Museum at Ellsworth Air Force Base, Rapid City, South Dakota
Air Defence Museum, CFB Bagotville, 3 Wing, Saguenay, Quebec, Canada
Comox Air Force Museum, CFB Comox, 19 Wing, Comox, British Columbia, British Columbia, Canada
Vermont National Guard Library and Museum, Camp Johnson, Colchester, Vermont
Jimmy Doolittle Air & Space Museum, Travis Air Force Base, California
National Atomic Testing Museum, Paradise, Nevada
Malmstrom Air Force Base Museum, Great Falls, Montana
National Museum of Nuclear Science & History, Albuquerque, New Mexico

See also

 How to Photograph an Atomic Bomb
 List of nuclear weapons
 AIM-26 Falcon

References

External links
 MB-1/AIR-2 Genie page on Boeing.com
 

Air-to-air rockets of the United States
Nuclear anti-aircraft weapons
Unguided nuclear rockets of the United States
Cold War rockets of the United States
Nuclear weapons of Canada
Nuclear missiles of the Cold War
Military equipment introduced in the 1950s